The World Rugby Under 20 Championship (known as the IRB Junior World Championship until 2014) is an international rugby union competition. The event is organised by the sport's governing body, World Rugby, and is contested by 12 men's junior national teams with an under-20 age requirement. This event replaced the IRB's former age-grade world championships, the Under 19 and Under 21 World Championships.

The inaugural tournament was held in June 2008, hosted by Wales and with 16 teams participating. Wales was announced as host for the inaugural tournament in November 2007.
The number of participating nations was reduced to 12 before the 2010 tournament due to financial reasons.
 
The U20 Championship is the upper level of the World Rugby tournament structure for under-20 national sides. At the same time that the U20 Championship was launched, World Rugby (then known as the International Rugby Board) also launched a second-level competition, the U20 Trophy, featuring eight teams.

Promotion and relegation between the Trophy and the Championship is in place. The winner of the Trophy will play in next year's Championship, while the last placed team at the Championship will be relegated to the Trophy for the next year.

Tournament results

Team records

Participating nations

Legend
 = Hosts
 = Champions
 = Runners-up
 = Third place
 = Fourth place
 = Relegated to World Rugby Under 20 Trophy
WT = Competed in the World Rugby Under 20 Trophy
q = Qualified
- = Did not qualify

World Rugby Junior Player of the Year

References

External links
 

 
Under 20
Under-20 rugby union competitions
Under 20